The list of shipwrecks in 1914 includes ships sunk, foundered, grounded, or otherwise lost in 1914.

January

February

March

April

May

June

July

August

September

October

November

December

Unknown date

See also 
 Lists of shipwrecks

References

1914
 
Ships